The flag of Vinnitsa Oblast is a flag which, together with the coat of arms, is the official symbol of the Vinnytsia Oblast, Ukraine. Approved on July 18, 1997.

Description 

The flag of the region is a blue rectangular banner with an aspect ratio of 2:3. In the center of the flag are the coats of arms of Podolia - the golden sun and the Bracław region (Eastern Podolia) - a silver cross with a blue shield with a silver crescent. Two red stripes are placed horizontally in the upper and lower parts at a distance of 1/10 from the edge of the canvas and 1/10 of the width. The combination of two equal red and blue stripes symbolizes the unity of the lands of Podolia and Bracław, and their repetition is in line with the heraldic decision to build the region's coat of arms. In addition, the two blue stripes on the edges of the flag symbolize the two deepest rivers of the region: the Dniester and the Southern Bug.

See also
 List of flags of Ukraine

References

Flags of Ukraine
Vinnytsia Oblast
Flags introduced in 1997